The Commonwealth Railways G class was a class of twenty-six  tender locomotives of the Commonwealth Railways, Australia. The class operated between Port Augusta (later, Port Pirie) and Kalgoorlie on the  Trans-Australian Railway.

History

The Commonwealth Railways was only inaugurated in 1911, so when in 1912 the railway planned to acquire its first locomotives, the decision was to adopt a design of proven reliability from another Australian railway system. The New South Wales Government Railways had the advantage of being the only other standard-gauge railway on the continent, and its 191-strong fleet of P class (later named C32 class) locomotives had been refined since their introduction 20 years earlier. In December 1912, companies were invited to quote for four locomotives based on the P class but with much larger tenders because of the long distances between watering points. They were to be deployed first during the construction phase. The small quantity resulted from the prospect of internal combustion locomotives becoming available, but it soon became clear that the technology was still immature.

The four were built by Clyde Engineering, Sydney and were delivered between March and June 1914. Twelve followed from the Baldwin Locomotive Works, Philadelphia, between May and August 1914. A further ten were delivered by the Toowoomba Foundry between June 1916 and October 1917.

It was intended that the G class would be used on goods trains, and that a new, faster Pacific design would be purchased for passenger trains. But funding was short during World War I, so the G class units were instead upgraded to make them suitable for through-express working and the new Pacific did not proceed. In any case, only about half of the line's track mileage was ballasted until the eve of World War II, and therefore could not take the weight of a Pacific's 20-ton axle load (the G  class axle load was 18 tons).

When the line opened in October 1917, the G class started hauling goods trains and passenger trains including the Trans-Australian Express (later named theTrans-Australian). Although they proved a reliable locomotive as with their New South Wales counterparts, the high mineral content of the water on the Trans-Australian Railway was a constant impediment. Two were withdrawn in 1925 followed by a third in 1930. In the 1930s, seven were fitted with superheated boilers to replace the saturated examples. These were reclassified as the Ga class. When the more powerful C class locomotives arrived in 1938, they were gradually displaced. Most of the remainder were withdrawn from late 1951 as the GM class diesel-electrics entered service. The last served as a shunter at Port Pirie until withdrawn in 1958.

One locomotive has been preserved; it is on display at the National Railway Museum, Port Adelaide.

References

Notes

Bibliography

External links

Baldwin locomotives
Clyde Engineering locomotives
G class
Railway locomotives introduced in 1914
4-6-0 locomotives
Standard gauge locomotives of Australia